Lapworth is a village and civil parish in Warwickshire, England. 

Lapworth is also a last name and may refer to:

Arthur Lapworth, a Scottish chemist
Bill Lapworth, an American naval architect
Charles Lapworth, an English geologist

Other uses:

Lake Lapworth, a postulated glacial lake in Great Britain
Lapworth Cirque, a cirque in the Shackleton Range, Antarctica
Lapworth Medal, the highest award of the Palaeontological Association
Lapworth Museum of Geology, a geological museum run by the University of Birmingham
Lapworth railway station serves the village of Kingswood, Warwickshire, near the village of Lapworth